Avangard is a rural locality (a settlement) and the administrative center of Avangard Rural Settlement of Alexeyevsky District, Samara Oblast, Russia. The population was 837 as of 2015. There are 11 streets.

Geography 
Avangard is located 5 km north of Alexeyevka (the district's administrative centre) by road. Alexeyevka is the nearest rural locality.

References 

Rural localities in Samara Oblast